Timothy Houlihan (born 10 February 1989) is a former Australian rules footballer who played for the West Coast Eagles in the Australian Football League (AFL), and also for  in the West Australian Football League (WAFL) and  in the South Australian National Football League (SANFL).

Football career

Originally from Harrow in country Victoria, Houlihan moved to South Australia with his mother after his parents split, and played for Goolwa and Goolwa /Port Elliot in South Australia's Great Southern Football League. He and his mother, a nurse, later moved to Kaltjiti (Fregon), a community in the APY lands in the state's far north, before finally returning to Victoria, where he played for Harrow Balmoral in the Horsham & District Football League. He was also a talented junior distance runner, winning the 1500m and 3000m races at the 2005 national championships. Playing for the North Ballarat Rebels in the under-18 TAC Cup, Houlihan recorded the best times in the beep test and 3km time trial at the 2006 AFL Draft Camp, and was subsequently selected by West Coast with pick 43 in the 2006 National Draft. He was very close with fellow teammate Ashton Hams. 
Houlihan retired before the start of the 2013 season after being diagnosed with a brain trauma injury. He had been knocked out in the last round of the previous season, following a sling tackle, although he had suffered several other concussions throughout his career. His retirement, which came after consultation with specialists in Adelaide, Melbourne, and Perth, made him the second former AFL player to retire due to brain injury, after former  player Daniel Bell.

References

External links

Tim Houlihan SANFL playing statistics
Tim Houlihan WAFL playing statistics

1989 births
Living people
Australian rules footballers from Victoria (Australia)
East Fremantle Football Club players
Greater Western Victoria Rebels players
South Adelaide Football Club players
West Coast Eagles players